Woori Bank (Hangul: 우리은행 Uri Eunhaeng) is a Korean multinational bank headquartered in Seoul. It is one of the four largest domestic banks in South Korea and is showing a strong presence not only for commercial banking but also for corporate finance in the Republic of Korea. It was originally founded in the 19th Century which it renamed and merged multiple times until it finally adopted its current name in 2002. Woori Bank is known the first South Korean bank to support web browsers other than Internet Explorer for online banking in Korea. As of 2020, Woori ranks 95 on the largest bank list in the world in terms of total assets which currently has 311,852 billion in USD as of the end of 2019.

History

19th century to 2000s
The bank was founded back in the 19th century, in the year 1899, which then it was called 'Daehan Cheon-il Bank'. It renamed to 'Joseon Sangup Bank'(Joseon Commercial Bank) in 1911, then 'Commercial Bank of Korea' in the 1950s. Following the 1997 Asian financial crisis, it merged with the former 'Hanil Bank' and 'Peace Bank' to become 'Hanvit Bank'. In 2001, it became a subsidiary of Woori Financial Group. The current name was adopted in 2002.
Its Jongno branch is located in the Gwangtonggwan, which is considered the oldest continuously operating bank building in Korea. On March 5, 2001, the branch was registered as Seoul City's Historic Landmark.

In 2014, after some amalgamation proceedings related to its parent company, Woori Bank absorbed Woori Financial Group.

Efforts for privatization
Even though privatization has been ongoing since 2010 to recover public funds, there is no clear purchase hope and it is being inspected. With the government crying out to maximize the recovery of public funds, it has been constantly raised whether or not to sell the 51.4% stake in the government.

The South Korean government is pursuing privatization based on the principle of maximizing public fund recovery, development of the financial industry, and early privatization, but the results are s. In low particular, the last government attempted to sell management rights and minority stakes separately but ended up in failure. This was because it was difficult to find a company that would acquire a 51.4% stake all at once.

On the other hand, the current South Korean government is considering a selling method which basically involves dividing the stake into equal shares for a few oligopoly shareholders. It is a method to show the ease of sale by selling the same stake to multiple investors, but it is characterized by the fact that Woori Bank's main shareholders are separated and are vulnerable to external management interference because the shares are split. The Public Fund Management Committee announced that it would plan and proceed with the sale of 30% first. However, there is a question about the willingness to execute because no specific schedule is mentioned.

Woori Bank has invested 12.8 trillion won in public funds, of which, in order to recover 4.4 trillion won, which is the unrecovered amount, it must increase by more than 50% of the current stock price. Discussions are underway among scholars about a temporary suspension for the sake of business safety and the banking industry due to the rapid sale.

The sale plan, which had been sluggish, changed to the sale of a 4-8% stake, rather than the sale of all stocks including management rights, and the recruitment of preliminary bidders ended on September 23, 2016. Currently, it is known that there are about 18 preliminary bidders, and the total buy-in interest is two or three times the 30% of the planned sale. The government plans to complete the sale of 30% of the stake by December 2016 and complete the privatization by selling all remaining shares in the second half of 2017. In addition, bidding is expected to commence on November 11, 2016, and the final decision will be made on November 13.

Sale of shares of Woori Bank Among the eight investors who participated in the bidding, sell a maximum of 6.0% to a minimum of 3.7% of shares to 7 companies including IMM Private Equity, Korea Investment & Securities, Kiwoom Securities, Hanwha Life Insurance, Tong Yang Life Insurance, Eugene Asset Management, and Mirae Asset Management. The first successful bid was sold on January 31, 2017.

Business

Branches 
The following lists all major offices and branches. All data are as of the end of January 2018 for Overseas and June 2020 for South Korea.

Domestic

 Number of branches and offices: 862

Overseas

 United States as Woori America Bank (multiple locations)
 London, United Kingdom
 Singapore, Singapore
 Tokyo, Japan
 Hanoi, Vietnam; Ho Chi Minh, Vietnam
 Bahrain, Bahrain
 Dhaka, Bangladesh
 Chennai, India
 Manila, Philippines as Wealthbank (Woori Bank Subsidiary) A Development Bank
 Dubai, UAE
 Sydney, Australia
 Jakarta, Indonesia as Woori Saudara Bank 
 Moscow, Russia; Saint Petersburg, Russia as Woori Bank Russia 
 Beijing, China as Woori Bank of China Limited
 Hong Kong, China, as Woori Investment Bank 
 São Paulo, Brazil as Brazil Woori Bank
 Yangon, Myanmar as Woori Finance Myanmar 
 Phnom Penh, Cambodia as Woori Finance Cambodia 
 Kuala Lumpur, Malaysia (Office)
 Teheran, Iran (Office)
 Kaesong Industrial Complex, North Korea (former)

In 2004, Woori Bank opened its Gaeseong Industrial Complex branch, in Gaeseong, North Korea, first foreign bank to do so in North Korea. Woori Bank has operations in Bangladesh, India and Indonesia. On 14 March 2012, its Indonesian subsidiary, Bank Woori Indonesia, announced a plan to merge with a local bank, Bank Saudara. In April 2012, Woori Bank opened its first branch in India at Chennai.

Clientele 
Woori Bank has major clientele from all over South Korea, including but not limited to: Samsung Electronics, CJ Group, Hanwha, Korea Institute of Science and Technology (KAIST), Pohang University of Science and Technology (POSTECH), Yonsei University, and Korean University of Foreign Studies (HUFS).

See also

List of banks in South Korea
Woori Financial Group

Notes

External links

 

Banks of South Korea
South Korean brands
Companies based in Seoul
Banks established in 1899
1899 establishments in Korea